The Roman Catholic Diocese of Palangkaraya is a diocese located in the city of Palangkaraya in the Ecclesiastical province of Samarinda in Indonesia.

History
 April 5, 1993: Established as the Diocese of Palangkaraya from the Diocese of Banjarmasin

Leadership
 Bishops of Palangkaraya (Roman rite)
 Bishop Aloysius Maryadi Sutrisnaatmaka, M.S.F. (January 23, 2001 – present)
 Bishop Yulius Aloysius Husin, M.S.F. (April 5, 1993 – October 13, 1994)

References
 GCatholic.org
 Catholic Hierarchy

Roman Catholic dioceses in Indonesia
Christian organizations established in 1993
Palangka Raya
Roman Catholic dioceses and prelatures established in the 20th century